Musese is a constituency in the Kavango West region of Namibia. The administrative capital is the settlement of Rupara.  the constituency had 6,494 registered voters.

In 2013 the Kavango Region was split into Kavango East and Kavango West. Musese was formed from the north-eastern part of the former Kahenge Constituency.

Politics
As in all Kavango West constituencies, SWAPO won the 2015 regional election by a landslide. Sakeus Kudumo received 2,582 votes, followed by Raphael Kapumburu of the All People's Party (APP, 213 votes). The 2020 regional election was also won by the SWAPO candidate. Kosmas Katura gained 1,628 votes. Vilho Kangumbe of the Popular Democratic Movement (PDM) came distant second with 201 votes.

See also
 Administrative divisions of Namibia

References 

Constituencies of Kavango West Region
States and territories established in 2013
2013 establishments in Namibia